This is a very short list of rivers in Uganda. This list is arranged by drainage basin, with respective tributaries indented under each larger stream's name.

Mediterranean Sea
Nile
White Nile (Bahr al Jabal) (Albert Nile)
Kidepo River
Narus River
Achwa River
Pager River
Ora River
Nyagak River
Victoria Nile
River Kafu (Kabi River) - also connects to the Nkusi River
Lugogo River
Mayanja River
Lake Kyoga
Sezibwa River
Lwajjali River
Lake Bisina
Okok River
Lake Victoria
Katonga River - also connects to Lake Edward, Lake George and the Semliki River via the Kazinga Channel
Mpaga River
Dura River
Kagera River
Lake Albert
Nkusi River
River Muzizi
Semliki River
Lamia River
Lake Edward and Lake George 
Ishasha River 
Turkwel River (Kenya)
Suam River

References

Central Intelligence Agency 2005
United Nations 2003
GEOnet Names Server

Uganda
Rivers